"The One with the Halloween Party" is the sixth episode of Friends eighth season. It first aired on the NBC network in the United States on November 1, 2001.

Phoebe Buffay's actor Lisa Kudrow said in 2014 that it is her favorite Friends episode, for several reasons. She said "number one was it was the first show we shot after 9/11. And that whole week, while driving in LA, people would pull up and give me a very sad look and a quiet 'thank you' for making them laugh".

Plot
At the last minute, Monica decides to throw a Halloween party; enthusiasm diminishes markedly when she announces that everyone needs to come in costume. Monica dresses up as Catwoman, Phoebe as Supergirl, Chandler as a large pink bunny (Monica's idea), Ross as a potato satellite that looks a lot like feces, which he calls Spud-nik, and Joey as Chandler. On account of her pregnancy, Rachel shows up to the party in an expensive dress she wants to wear because she soon will not be able to fit into it. Rachel's maternal instinct kicks in when the first trick-or-treaters arrive, and she spends the evening handing out candy... most of it to a smart little girl who figures out how to charm her. She is then reduced to handing out cash until Gunther can get them some more. Finally a boy arrives who would rather have money than candy, and she yells at him until he runs away, crying—at which point guilt kicks in and she runs after him. She ends up giving him $50 and going to several houses with him posing as his girlfriend. On her return, she confesses to Joey that she is not entirely cut out for motherhood yet.

Phoebe runs into her twin sister Ursula on the street. Ursula reveals that she is getting married next week and invites Phoebe to the wedding; to return the favor, Phoebe invites her and her fiancé to Monica's Halloween party. Ursula's fiancé Eric (Sean Penn), a 2nd-grade schoolteacher, arrives first and immediately slaps Phoebe's butt; after working through his embarrassment, they begin talking. It becomes clear after some conversation that Ursula has been lying to him, basically returning his own answers to him about her age, pastimes, history and employment, including herself being a teacher at the fictional "Top-Secret Elementary School for the Children of Spies". This, compounded by Eric's sudden urge to be impulsive and romantic, resulted in the two planning to be married barely three weeks after meeting. Phoebe, using Ursula's misplaced purse as evidence, breaks the news to him as gently as she can.

Ross's girlfriend Mona also attends the party and is the first to correctly interpret Ross's costume; Ross is nervous that Joey, who has also shown attraction to her, will steal her from him. Monica and Joey get into a debate over who would win a fight between Ross and Chandler; Monica secretly thinks her brother is stronger than her husband but cannot express her opinion without offending someone. However, Joey lets it slip to Ross and Chandler, who get very competitive at each other. The two take it into their own hands by staging an arm-wrestling competition, which lasts, at total deadlock, for quite some time. Ross, who needs to impress his girlfriend, convinces Chandler to let him win, but refuses to admit it when asked later. Chandler offers to prove it to Monica, and the two find themselves at yet another arm-wrestling stalemate.

Reception
Bustle included the episode on their list of the 7 Friends episodes to watch on Halloween.

References

2001 American television episodes
Friends (season 8) episodes
Halloween television episodes